"Western Girls" is a song co-written and recorded by American country music artist Marty Stuart.  It was released in September 1990 as the fourth single from the album Hillbilly Rock.  The song reached #20 on the Billboard Hot Country Singles & Tracks chart.  It was written by Stuart and Paul Kennerley.

Critical reception
A review from the Gavin Report was positive, stating that "follows the same rockin' formula" as his previous single "and should further endear him to listeners."

Charts

References

1990 singles
Marty Stuart songs
Songs written by Paul Kennerley
Songs written by Marty Stuart
Song recordings produced by Tony Brown (record producer)
MCA Records singles
1989 songs